Kennebunk may refer to multiple things located in the U.S. state of Maine:

 Kennebunk, Maine, a town
 Kennebunk (CDP), Maine, census-designated place within the town
 West Kennebunk, Maine, census-designated place
 The Kennebunk River